José Luis 'Pepelu' Vidal Romero (born 27 August 1995) is a Spanish footballer who plays for Atlético Antoniano as a forward.

Club career
Born in Lebrija, Province of Seville, Vidal joined Real Betis' youth setup in 2006, aged 11. On 30 July 2013 he signed a contract extension with the Andalusians.

On 28 November 2013, while still a junior, Vidal made his first-team debut, coming on as a late substitute in a 0–1 away loss against Lyon in that season's UEFA Europa League. On 20 January 2015, after appearing rarely with the reserves, he was loaned to Tercera División club Algeciras CF until June.

On 24 July 2015 Vidal was released by the Verdiblancos. He subsequently joined Recreativo de Huelva, being initially assigned to the reserves in the regional leagues.

Pepelu joined Club Atlético Antoniano in December 2015. After scoring 15 goals in 20 appearances, he signed for Getafe CF B on 5 August 2016.

On 28 October 2016, Pepelu returned to Atlético Antoniano, after receiving little playing time at Geta.

References

External links

Beticopedia profile 

Pepelu Vidal at La Preferente

1995 births
Living people
Spanish footballers
Spanish expatriate footballers
Footballers from Andalusia
Association football forwards
Segunda División B players
Tercera División players
Real Betis players
Algeciras CF footballers
Atlético Onubense players
Recreativo de Huelva players
Getafe CF B players
Atlético Sanluqueño CF players
Spanish expatriate sportspeople in Iceland
Expatriate footballers in Iceland